is a 1988 video game developed by Game Studio and published by Namco for the Family Computer. It is the third game in Babylonian Castle Saga series which started with the 1984 arcade game, The Tower of Druaga.

The game was ported to the Nintendo Switch in the Japanese game compilation Namcot Collection in August 2020, as DLC.

Plot
The story of The Quest of Ki acts as a prequel to The Tower of Druaga. It occurs shortly after the demon Druaga has stolen the Blue Crystal Rod and taken to a tower originally built by the Sumer Empire, in which the god Anu had destroyed. The goddess Ishtar gives the priestess Ki a golden tiara that enables the power of flight, and sends her to the tower in order to retrieve The Blue Crystal Rod. The game then follows her doomed quest to the top of the tower, with help from the dragon Quox. Upon reaching the 60th floor, Ki reaches the Blue Crystal Rod, but Druaga splits the rod into three pieces and transforms Ki into stone, leading up to the events of The Tower of Druaga.

Gameplay
The game is a side-scrolling platformer with one hundred levels. In each level, the player's goal is to pick up a key and open the door leading to the next area. Various enemies, including slimes, ghosts, and wizards, appear on each floor, and any contact with them results in death.

Ki has no weapons, and thus can not damage or defeat any of the enemies. Her only abilities are to dash and jump. As long as the player holds the jump button down, Ki can rise indefinitely into the air. However, contact with the ceiling or dashing against a wall will cause her to drop to the ground and become stunned for several seconds. This mechanic of floating and getting stunned from bumping against the walls or ceiling is similar to the 1983 Atari vector arcade game, Major Havoc.

Many of the levels consist of puzzles in which the player must carefully regulate the height and direction of Ki's jumps. Each stage in the game contains one or more treasure chests, which hold various items. Although many of the items bestow helpful abilities, the effects only last for the floor on which they were found. 

After completing the game, players can gain access to forty bonus stages. These stages contain cameos from the Pac-Man ghosts and the enemies from Dig Dug.

Notes

See also 
 GameCenter CX, a Japanese TV program that used the game in one of challenges during the final episode of the 7th season and the first episode of the 8th season.

References 

1988 video games
Japan-exclusive video games
Nintendo Entertainment System games
Nintendo Entertainment System-only games
Platform games
Video games developed in Japan
Video games featuring female protagonists
Video game prequels
Inanna